A Manx comet is a rocky, minor, celestial body that has a long-period comet orbit. Unlike most bodies on a long-period comet orbit which typically sport long, bright tails, the Manx comet is tailless, more typical of an inner Solar System asteroid. The nickname comes from the Manx breed of tailless cat. Examples include C/2013 P2 (PANSTARRS), discovered on 4 August 2013, which has an orbital period greater than 51 million years, and C/2014 S3 (PANSTARRS), discovered on 22 September 2014, which is thought to originate from the Oort cloud and could help explain the formation of the Solar System.

References

External links 
 JPL Small-Body Database Browser: C/2013 P2 (PANSTARRS)
 JPL Small-Body Database Browser: C/2014 S3 (PANSTARRS)

Comets
Oort cloud